The Zydretae (Zudrêtai or Zudreitai) were an ancient people of Colchis recorded by the Classical accounts as dwelling on the coast of the Pontus Euxinus (Black Sea), on the southern side of the Apsarus river (modern-day Çoruh/Chorokhi in the borderlands of Turkey and Georgia), and between the Machelonoi and the Lazi tribes. The early 2nd century Roman author Arrian lists several neighboring and probably ethnically related tribes on a west to east orientation: the Sannoi (Sanigs), Drilae, Machelonoi, Heniochoi, Zudreitai, and Lazoi (Perip. 1 1.1-2). The anonymous (probably post-4th century) Periplus Ponti Euxini places them further south between the Akamosis and Archabis rivers. Little is known about the Zydretae’s social and political life, but at that time when Arrian described them (c. 130s AD), they seem to have been subjected to the king of Iberia in eastern Georgia.

References

Ancient peoples of Georgia (country)
Tribes in Greco-Roman historiography
Anatolia
Ancient peoples of Anatolia